David Ulm (born 30 June 1984) is a French footballer who plays as a striker.

References

External links
 

1984 births
Living people
French people of German descent
Association football forwards
French footballers
RC Strasbourg Alsace players
FC Mulhouse players
Sportfreunde Siegen players
FSV Frankfurt players
Kickers Offenbach players
SV Sandhausen players
Arminia Bielefeld players
2. Bundesliga players
3. Liga players
People from Wissembourg
Footballers from Alsace
Sportspeople from Bas-Rhin
Expatriate footballers in Germany
French expatriate footballers
French expatriate sportspeople in Germany